Heuksando is an island in the Yellow Sea located off 97.2 km from the southwest coast of Mokpo, Jeollanam-do, South Korea. It covers an area of 19.7 km2 and consists of several peaks: Munamsan (문암산/ 400m), Gitdaebong (깃대봉/ 378m), Seonyubong (선유봉/ 300m), Sangnasan (상라산/ 227m). It is within the administrative boundaries of Sinan County, Jeollanam-do, South Korea since 1969. The island's 19.7 km2 are home to about 3,133 people.

Climate

Gallery

See also
Jang Bo-go
Islands of South Korea

References

External links 

  www.heuksando.com

Sinan County, South Jeolla
Islands of South Jeolla Province
Islands of the Yellow Sea